The Irish Film and Television Award for Best Supporting Actor was an award bestowed by the Irish Film & Television Academy celebrating outstanding performances by actors in supporting roles in films and television dramas. It was a joint category until 2005, where actors were nominated from films and television dramas for the same award. The 3rd Irish Film & Television Awards introduced the current separate categories: Irish Film & Television Award for Best Actor in a Supporting Role - Film and Irish Film and Television Award for Best Actor in a Supporting Role - Television.

Winners

2003-2004

Winners in Film

2000s

2010s

2020s

Winners in Television Drama

2000s

2010s

2020s

See also 
 Irish Film & Television Award for Best Supporting Actress – Film

References 

Supporting Actor